Mudgee is a wine region and Australian Geographical Indication in the Central Ranges zone in the Australian state of New South Wales. It is named for the town of Mudgee.

Grapes were first grown around Mudgee from 1858, reaching a peak of 55 vineyards in 1893. Large wineries started planting again from 1974. Mudgee grows predominantly red wine varieties, especially Shiraz, Cabernet Sauvignon and Merlot.

Winemaking
With a viticultural history that stretches back to 1858, Mudgee has played a key role in Australian viticultural history. Mudgee is primarily a producer of red wines, but the region also has a clone of Chardonnay.

Wineries in Mudgee

References

Wine regions of New South Wales
Mudgee, New South Wales